is a railway station in the city of Jōetsu, Niigata, Japan, jointly operated by East Japan Railway Company (JR East) and the third-sector railway operator Echigo Tokimeki Railway.

Lines
Naoetsu Station is served by the JR East Shinetsu Main Line, and is a terminus for the line, whose tracks are shared by the  Hokuetsu Express Hokuhoku Line.

Station layout

The station has three island platforms with an elevated station building. The station has a Midori no Madoguchi staffed ticket office.

Platforms

History

Naoetsu Station opened on 15 August  1886. With the privatization of JNR on 1 April 1987, the station came under the joint control of JR East and JR West.

From this date, Naoetsu Station became a boundary station between the Myōkō Haneuma Line (former JR East Shinetsu Main Line) and the Nihonkai Hisui Line (former JR West Hokuriku Main Line) of the Niigata-owned Echigo Tokimeki Railway Company.

Passenger statistics
In fiscal 2017, the Myōkō Haneuma Line portion of the station was used by an average of 1,516 passengers daily (boarding passengers only). In fiscal 2017, the JR portion of the station was used by an average of 2,203 passengers daily (boarding passengers only).

Surrounding area

 Sado Steam Ship Ferry Terminal

References

External links

 Naoetsu Station (ETR Official Website) )
 Naoetsu Station (JR East Official Website) 

Railway stations in Japan opened in 1986
Railway stations in Niigata Prefecture
Shin'etsu Main Line
Stations of East Japan Railway Company
Stations of Hokuetsu Express
Stations of Echigo Tokimeki Railway
Railway stations in Japan opened in 1886
Jōetsu, Niigata